The 3rd G7 Summit was held in London, United Kingdom between 7–8 May 1977. The venue for the summit meetings was the British Prime Minister's official residence at No. 10 Downing Street in London.

The Group of Seven (G7) was an unofficial forum which brought together the heads of the richest industrialized countries: France, West Germany, Italy, Japan, the United Kingdom, the United States, Canada (since 1976), and the President of the European Commission (starting officially in 1981). The summits were not meant to be linked formally with wider international institutions; and in fact, a mild rebellion against the stiff formality of other international meetings was a part of the genesis of cooperation between France's president Valéry Giscard d'Estaing and West Germany's chancellor Helmut Schmidt as they conceived the first Group of Six (G6) summit in 1975.

This was the initial meeting in which the President of the European Commission was formally invited to take a part.

Leaders at the summit

The G7 is an unofficial annual forum for the leaders of Canada, the European Commission, France, Germany, Italy, Japan, the United Kingdom, and the United States.
   
The 3rd G7 summit was the first summit for Italian Prime Minister Giulio Andreotti, Japanese Prime Minister Takeo Fukuda, and US President Jimmy Carter.

Participants
These summit participants are the current "core members" of the international forum:

Issues
The summit was intended as a venue for resolving differences among its members. As a practical matter, the summit was also conceived as an opportunity for its members to give each other mutual encouragement in the face of difficult economic decisions.

Accomplishments
The leaders came out with the Downing Street Summit Declaration.

Gallery

See also
 G8

Notes

References
 Bayne, Nicholas and Robert D. Putnam. (2000).  Hanging in There: The G7 and G8 Summit in Maturity and Renewal. Aldershot, Hampshire, England: Ashgate Publishing. ; OCLC 43186692
 Reinalda, Bob and Bertjan Verbeek. (1998).  Autonomous Policy Making by International Organizations. London: Routledge.  ; ;   OCLC 39013643

External links
 No official website is created for any G7 summit prior to 1995 -- see the 21st G7 summit.
 University of Toronto: G8 Research Group, G8 Information Centre
 G7 1977, delegations & documents

1970s in the City of Westminster
G7 summit
1977 in international relations
G7 summit 1977
G7 summit 1977
G7 summit
G7 summit 1977
G7 summit 1977
Events in London
1977
May 1977 events in the United Kingdom